Antonio Balzano (born 13 June 1986) is an Italian footballer who plays as a defender.

Career

Early career
He grows with juvenile team of Bitonto. He joined at S.S.C. Bari when he was a boy.

Pescara
In July 2011, Balzano moved to Serie B side Pescara when his former club Atletico Roma dissolved. He made regular appearances for three years in Pescara and also served as a captain in his last term with the team.

Cagliari
Balzano joined Serie A side Cagliari in July 2014, where he was reunited with his former Pescara manager, Zdeněk Zeman.

On 30 July 2015, Balzano extended the contract until 2018.

In July 2016, he joined Serie B club Cesena on loan, with an conditional obligation to buy if the club won promotion to Serie A.

On 4 February 2022, Balzano signed with Seregno in Serie C.

References

External links
 
 
 AIC profile (data by football.it)  

Living people
1986 births
People from Bitonto
Footballers from Apulia
Association football fullbacks
Italian footballers
S.S.C. Bari players
Atletico Roma F.C. players
Delfino Pescara 1936 players
Cagliari Calcio players
A.C. Cesena players
U.S. 1913 Seregno Calcio players
Serie A players
Serie B players
Serie C players
Sportspeople from the Metropolitan City of Bari